Vincent Lacoste (born 3 July 1993) is a French actor. He began his acting career at the age of fifteen, playing the lead role of Hervé in the film The French Kissers. The role won him the Lumières Award for Most Promising Actor and a nomination for the César Award for Most Promising Actor in 2010. He was awarded the Prix Patrick Dewaere in 2016. He is the main character of Le jeune acteur graphic novel which recounts how he was selected for his first film.

Filmography

References

External links

 

Living people
1993 births
French male film actors
French male stage actors
21st-century French male actors
Male actors from Paris
Most Promising Actor Lumières Award winners